D-Box (variously capitalised and punctuated) may refer to:

 D-BOX Technologies, a Canadian company which produces motion simulation systems
 DBox or DBox 2, German digital television decoders by Nokia
 D-Box drift assist system for RC cars by Hobby Products International
 dbox, an email storage format used by Dovecot (software)
 D-box (also D'box and D box, short for "destruction box"), a structure within certain proteins, such as cyclins, involved in the cell cycle
 D-box, a construction feature in the leading edge of some airplane wings, from the spar forward, which provides strength and minimizes twisting.